Yong Shu Hoong (born 1966) is a Singaporean poet and educator.

Biography 
Yong was born in Singapore in 1966. He grew up in a bilingual household and published his first story in a Chinese student literary magazine.

Yong studied Computer Science at the National University of Singapore (NUS) after his National Service, and worked as a programmer at the Development Bank of Singapore in 1990. It was at NUS that he began writing. He was a contributor to the campus newspaper, and would regularly publish tabloid articles.

Two years later, Yong left his job at DBS and enrolled in Texas A&M University to read for a Masters in Business Administration. Hee started writing poetry in the form of love songs, emulating New Wave bands he looked up to like Duran Duran and Spandau Ballet. Later, he joined the literary magazine Inkshed Press.

Yong is a part-time tutor at Nanyang Technological University, and is a regular contributor to newspapers like The Straits Times and My Paper.

Literary activities 
In 1994, Yong submitted a manuscript of forty to fifty poems to the Singapore Literature Prize and was shortlisted. It was through this that he met Enoch Ng, who would prove instrumental in his literary career. Ng's eventual founding of Firstfruits Publications gave Yong a platform on which to present his work, and his shrewdness of editing provided Yong with a literary rigor he had not been exposed to previously. Enoch would go on to publish four of Yong's poetry collections under the publishing house Firstfruits Publications.

Yong's work has also appeared in journals like the Quarterly Literary Review Singapore, Asia Literary Review, and anthologies like Language for a New Century (2008) and Balik Kampung (2012).

Apart from writing, Yong has also contributed to the growth of the literary scene in various ways. In 2001, Yong founded subTEXT, a forum for readings by authors. He also managed the Mentor Access Project through Mediaexodus Limited Liability Partnership, which provided aspiring writers exposure to the Singaporean literary scene, and gave them access to guidance from older writers.

Works

References 

1966 births
Living people
Singaporean poets
Raffles Institution alumni
Raffles Junior College alumni
National University of Singapore alumni